The 1999–2000 Connecticut Huskies men's basketball team represented the University of Connecticut in the 1999–2000 collegiate men's basketball season. The Huskies completed the season with a 25–10 overall record. The Huskies were members of the Big East Conference where they finished with a 10–6 record. They made it to the Second Round in the 2000 NCAA Division I men's basketball tournament. The Huskies played their home games at Harry A. Gampel Pavilion in Storrs, Connecticut and the Hartford Civic Center in Hartford, Connecticut, and they were led by fourteenth-year head coach Jim Calhoun.

Roster
Listed are the student athletes who were members of the 1999–2000 team.

Schedule 

|-
!colspan=12 style=""| Regular Season

|-
!colspan=12 style=""| Big East tournament

|-
!colspan=12 style=""| NCAA tournament

Schedule Source:

References 

UConn Huskies men's basketball seasons
Connecticut Huskies
Connecticut Huskies
1999 in sports in Connecticut
2000 in sports in Connecticut